Raynald "Ray" Cooper III (born February 7, 1993) is an American mixed martial artist who competes in the Welterweight division. A professional competitor since 2012, Cooper is most notable for his time in the Professional Fighters League (PFL), where he is a two-time Welterweight champion. Fight Matrix had him ranked a top 10 Welterweight in the world in May 2022. He is currently ranked #16.

Early life
Born and raised in Pearl City, Hawaii, Cooper got into many fights in the schoolyard, beginning to wrestle at the age of six and trained under the tutelage of his father, Ray Cooper Jr., a professional fighter. In Hawaii, Cooper was a three-time state champion wrestler and two-time Oahu Interscholastic Association champion, winning his last championship at 173 lbs. Upon graduating at the age of 18, he began his career in professional MMA, turning down a college scholarship to continue wrestling. Starting to train with his uncles Ronald Jhun and David “Kawika” Pa’aluhi, also fellow former fighters, and his father, Cooper was the first Cooper sibling, 6 of them in total, to skip college.

Mixed martial arts career

Early career
Cooper began competing as an amateur in 2011, compiling a record of 3-0 before turning professional in 2012. He competed in promotions King of the Cage, Gladiator Challenge, X-1 and PXC. He compiled a record of 13-5 before being signed by the Professional Fighters League.

Professional Fighters League
On July 5, 2018, Cooper made his PFL debut at PFL 3 defeating former Strikeforce Middleweight Champion Jake Shields via technical knockout in the second round.

On August 16, 2018, Cooper defeated Pavel Kusch at PFL 6 in 18 seconds of the first round advancing to the playoffs.

On October 20, 2018, Cooper faced Jake Shields in a rematch at PFL 10. He won the fight via technical knockout in the first round to advance to the semifinals of the playoffs. In the semifinals, Cooper defeated Handesson Ferreira in a rematch via technical knockout to advance to the Welterweight finals.

Cooper faced Magomed Magomedkerimov in the finals at PFL 11 on December 31, 2018. Cooper lost the fight via a guillotine choke submission in the second round. Cooper said of the fight, “I left my neck out too much. I thought I was winning that fight, you know, I was pressing the action. I just left my neck out. He has some slick guillotines, he has some long arms."

Cooper re-entered the welterweight tournament in 2019, facing his cousin, Zane Kamaka on May 9, 2019 at PFL 1. He won the bout via rear-naked choke in the second round.

On July 11, 2019 at PFL 4, he faced John Howard, losing the bout after getting knocked out in the first round.

He faced Sadibou Sy in the quarterfinals at PFL 7 on October 11, 2019. The fight ended in a draw with Cooper advancing. In the semifinals at the same event, he faced Chris Curtis and won by knockout in the second round. Cooper faced David Michaud in the finals at PFL 10 on December 31, 2019. He won the fight via TKO in the second round to win the 2019 PFL Welterweight Tournament.

Cooper faced Jason Ponet on April 29, 2021 at PFL 2 as the start of the 2021 PFL Welterweight tournament. He won the bout with an arm-triangle choke in the first round.

Cooper faced Nikolay Aleksakhin at PFL 5 on June 17, 2021. He won the bout via unanimous decision.

Cooper faced Rory MacDonald in the Semifinals off the Welterweight tournament on August 13, 2021 at PFL 7. He won the bout via unanimous decision.

Cooper rematched Magomed Magomedkerimov in the Finals of the Welterweight tournament on 27 October 2021 at PFL 10. Cooper had previously faced Magomedkerimov in the finals of the 2018 tournament, losing the bout via guillotine in the second round. He won the bout this time tho via knockout in the third round, winning the 2021 PFL Welterweight Tournament and another $1 million dollar prize.

Cooper was scheduled to face Magomed Umalatov on May 6, 2022 at PFL 3. Umalatov would pull out of the bout and be replaced by former LFA Welterweight Champion Carlos Leal. At weigh-ins, Ray Cooper III missed weight for the bouts, weighing in at 176.4 pounds, 5.4 pounds over the welterweight non-title fight limit.He was fined 20 percent of their purses, ineligible to win playoff points, given a walkover loss, and was penalized one point in the standings In an upset, Cooper lost the bout via unanimous decision.

Cooper faced Brett Cooper on July 1, 2022 at PFL 6. He won the bout via TKO stoppage 24 seconds into the bout.

Personal life
Cooper has four younger brothers; Bronson, Blake, Baylen and Makoa. All won wrestling state titles as well, with Blake, now a mixed martial artist, winning three. Both Blake and Baylen wrestled for Warner Pacific University where they were NAIA national champions and All-Americans. He also has a younger sister named Makana who is currently competing in the Hawaii High School Girls Wrestling division. Even Cooper's wife is a former high school state wrestling champion.

Cooper and his wife Kelly have five children, with his last two children being twins.

Championships and accomplishments
Professional Fighters League
2019 PFL Welterweight Championship
2021 PFL Welterweight Championship
Fastest Knockout in PFL History (0:18) 
Gladiator Challenge Fights
Gladiator Challenge Lightweight Championship (One time)

Mixed martial arts record

|-
|Win
|align=center|25–8–1
|Brett Cooper
|TKO (knees and punches)
|PFL 6
|
|align=center|1
|align=center|0:24
|Atlanta, Georgia, United States
|
|-
|Loss
|align=center|24–8–1
|Carlos Leal
|Decision (unanimous) 
|PFL 3
|
|align=center|3
|align=center|5:00
|Arlington, Texas, United States
|
|-
|Win
|align=center|24–7–1
|Magomed Magomedkerimov
|KO (punches)
|PFL 10 
|
|align=center|3
|align=center|3:02
|Hollywood, Florida, United States
|
|-
|Win
|align=center|23–7–1
|Rory MacDonald
|Decision (unanimous)
|PFL 7 
|
|align=center|3
|align=center|5:00
|Hollywood, Florida, United States
|
|-
| Win
|align=center|22–7–1
|Nikolay Aleksakhin	
|Decision (unanimous)
|PFL 5 
|
|align=center|3
|align=center|5:00
|Atlantic City, New Jersey, United States
|
|-
|Win
|align=center|21–7–1
|Jason Ponet
| Submission (arm-triangle choke)
| PFL 2
| 
| align=center| 1
| align=center| 1:23
| Atlantic City, New Jersey, United States
|
|-
|Win
|align=center|20–7–1
|David Michaud
|TKO (punches)
|PFL 10
|
|align=center|2
|align=center|2:56
|New York City, New York, United States
|.
|-
|Win
|align=center|19–7–1
|Chris Curtis
|KO (punch)
|rowspan=2 | PFL 7
|rowspan=2 | 
|align=center| 2
|align=center| 0:11
|rowspan=2 | Las Vegas, Nevada, United States
|
|-
|Draw
|align=center|
|Sadibou Sy	
|Draw (unanimous)
|align=center| 2
|align=center| 5:00
|
|-
| Loss
| align=center|18–7
| John Howard
| KO (punches)
| PFL 4
| 
| align=center| 1 
| align=center| 3:23
| Atlantic City, New Jersey, United States
| 
|-
| Win
| align=center|18–6
| Zane Kamaka
| Submission (rear-naked choke)
| PFL 1
| 
| align=center| 2 
| align=center| 4:29
| Uniondale, New York, United States
| 
|-
|Loss
|align=center|17–6
|Magomed Magomedkerimov
|Submission (guillotine choke)
|PFL 11
|
|align=center|2
|align=center|2:18
|New York City, New York, United States 
|
|- 
|Win
|align=center|17–5
|Handesson Ferreira
|TKO (punches)
| rowspan=2 |PFL 10
| rowspan=2 |
|align=center|1
|align=center|2:28
| rowspan=2 |Washington, D.C., United States
|
|- 
|Win
|align=center|16–5
|Jake Shields
|TKO (punches)
|align=center|1
|align=center|3:10
|
|- 
|Win
|align=center|15–5
|Pavel Kusch
|TKO (punches)
|PFL 6
|
|align=center|1
|align=center|0:18
|Atlantic City, New Jersey, United States
|
|- 
|Win
|align=center|14–5
|Jake Shields
|TKO (punches)
|PFL 3
|
|align=center|2
|align=center|2:09
|Washington, D.C., United States
|
|-
|Loss
|align=center|13–5
|Handesson Ferreira
|Decision (unanimous)
|Mid-Pacific Championships 5
|
|align=center|3
|align=center|5:00
|Honolulu, Hawaii, United States
|
|-
|Win
|align=center|13–4
|Charles Bennett
|TKO (punches)
|X-1 48: Braddah vs. Felony
|
|align=center|2
|align=center|2:48
|Honolulu, Hawaii, United States
|
|-
|Win
|align=center|12–4
|Jonathan Pico
|Submission (rear naked choke)
|X-1 46: Armed and Dangerous
|
|align=center|1
|align=center|3:16
|Kahului, Hawaii, United States
|
|-
|Loss
|align=center|11–4
|Jun Yong Park
|Submission (anaconda choke)
|Pacific Xtreme Combat 56
|
|align=center|1
|align=center|N/A
|Guam
|
|-
|Win
|align=center|11–3
|Matthew Colquhoun
|KO (punch)
|X-1 45: Live
|
|align=center|1
|align=center|0:04
|Honolulu, Hawaii, United States
|
|-
|Win
|align=center|10–3
|Zach Conn
|KO (punches)
|X-1 44: The Return
|
|align=center|1
|align=center|0:12
|Honolulu, Hawaii, United States
|
|-
|Win
|align=center|9–3
|Gabe Rivas
|KO (punches)
|Star Elite Cage Fighting
|
|align=center|1
|align=center|1:41
|Waipahu, Hawaii, United States
|
|-
|Win
|align=center|8–3
|Josh Drake
|Submission (front choke)
|Gladiator Challenge: Season's Beatings
|
|align=center|1
|align=center|1:06
|Rancho Mirage, California, United States
|
|-
|Win
|align=center|7–3
|Adrian Bartree
|KO (punch)
|Gladiator Challenge: Showdown
|
|align=center|1
|align=center|0:34
|Rancho Mirage, California, United States
|
|-
|Win
|align=center|6–3
|David Douglas
|TKO (punches)
|Star Elite Cage Fighting
|
|align=center|1
|align=center|0:27
|Waipahu, Hawaii, United States
|
|-
|Win
|align=center|5–3
|Dave Mazany
|Submission (rear naked choke)
|Star Elite Cage Fighting
|
|align=center|2
|align=center|1:24
|Waipahu, Hawaii, United States
|
|-
|Win
|align=center|4–3
|Jody Carter
|TKO (punches)
|Gladiator Challenge: Season's Beatings
|
|align=center|1
|align=center|1:58
|Rancho Mirage, California, United States
|
|-
|Loss
|align=center|3–3
|Craig Jackson
|TKO (strikes)
|War On The Valley Isle 3
|
|align=center|1
|align=center|2:25
|Kahului, Hawaii, United States
|
|-
|Loss
|align=center|3–2
|Danny Navarro
|Submission (guillotine choke)
|Gladiator Challenge: Payback
|
|align=center|1
|align=center|1:34
|San Jacinto, California, United States
|
|-
|Win
|align=center|3–1
|Nate Harris
|Submission (guillotine choke)
|Destiny MMA: Na Koa 5
|
|align=center|1
|align=center|2:52
|Honolulu, Hawaii, United States
|
|-
|Loss
|align=center|2–1
|Joey Gomez
|Technical Submission (rear-naked choke)
|Destiny MMA: Na Koa 3
|
|align=center|1
|align=center|2:21
|Honolulu, Hawaii, United States
|
|-
|Win
|align=center|2–0
|Adam Smith
|Submission (rear-naked choke)
|Destiny MMA: Na Koa 2
|
|align=center|1
|align=center|4:41
|Honolulu, Hawaii, United States
|
|-
|Win
|align=center|1–0
|Kani Correa
|KO (punch)
|KOTC Ali'is
|
|align=center|1
|align=center|0:08
|Honolulu, Hawaii, United States
|

See also
List of male mixed martial artists

References

External links
 Ray Cooper III PFL Fighter Profile
  
 
  

American male mixed martial artists
Mixed martial artists from Hawaii
Lightweight mixed martial artists
Welterweight mixed martial artists
Mixed martial artists utilizing wrestling
American male sport wrestlers
Amateur wrestlers
Living people
1993 births